"Harabo Toke" (English: Flee with You) is a romantic Bengali song from the soundtrack to the 2016 Indo-Bangladeshi film Shikari. Composed by Indraadip Dasgupta with lyrics by Prasen (Prasenjit Mukherjee), the song is sung by Shaan. The music video features actors Shakib Khan and Srabanti Chatterjee.

Release and response 
The first song Harabo Toke was released on 16 June 2016 in both Bangladesh (Jaaz Music) and India (Eskay Music). The singer Shaan performed the song. The track featured Shakib Khan & Srabanti Chatterjee and the music video was shot in London. The video received an overwhelming response on YouTube, and creating record of becoming the fastest Bengali language video track to reach 1 million views within 36 Hours. The track received praises from audiences and critics.

Critical reception 
The song received mostly positive reaction from the music critics.

See also
 O Priya Tumi Kothay

References

External links
 Harabo Toke song Lyrics

Bangladeshi film songs
2016 songs
Songs written for films
Bengali film songs